The following is a list of notable people from Taunton, Massachusetts, USA. These individuals were born in Taunton, were long-time residents of the city, or were buried within the city limits.

 Isaac Babbitt (1799–1862), inventor, manufactured the first tableware made of Britannia metal; made the first brass cannon cast in the U.S.; patented the Babbitt metal
 David Cobb (1748–1830), State court judge in Massachusetts, 1784; member of Massachusetts House of Representatives, 1789; U.S. Representative from Massachusetts 3rd District, 1793–1795; member of Massachusetts Senate, 1802; lieutenant governor of Massachusetts, 1809–1810
 Darius N. Couch (1822–1897), U.S. Army officer, naturalist, and a Union army general in the American Civil War
 Samuel Leonard Crocker (1804–1883), politician; U.S. Representative from Massachusetts 2nd District, 1853–1855
 Stephanie Cutter (born 1968), Deputy Senior Advisor to President Barack Obama
 Richard De Wert (1931–1951), soldier (Korean War), Medal of Honor recipient; a guided missile frigate, the USS De Wert was named in honor of his heroics
 Eric DeCosta, Executive Vice President and general manager for the Baltimore Ravens (2003–present)
 William Z. Foster (1881–1961), American Communist Party's presidential candidate in 1924, 1928, and 1932; also, party chairman from 1945 to 1956
 Adam Gaudette (born 1996), professional ice hockey player
 Alan Gifford (1911–1989), actor
 Scott Hemond (born 1965), baseball player; former infielder for the Oakland Athletics
 James Leonard Hodges (1790–1846), politician; member of Massachusetts General Court; U.S. Representative from Massachusetts 12th District, 1827–1833
 Leon Kamin (1927–2017), psychologist, co-authored the book Not in Our Genes (1974)
 William Standish Knowles (1917–2012), chemist, 2001 Nobel Prize laureate winner in Chemistry for his and his colleagues' work on chirally catalysed hydrogenation reactions
 Steven Laffoley (born 1965), author of creative-nonfiction and fiction works, including the award-winning Shadowboxing: the Rise and Fall of George Dixon (2012)
 Robert Milton Leach (1879–1952), politician; U.S. Representative from Massachusetts 15th District, 1924–1925; alternate delegate to Republican National Convention from Massachusetts, 1928
 Emily Levesque, Assistant Professor in Astronomy at University of Washington
 William Croad Lovering (1835–1910), politician; Member of Massachusetts Senate, 1874–1875; delegate to Republican National Convention from Massachusetts, 1880; U.S. Representative from Massachusetts, 1897–1910 (12th District 1897–1903, 14th District 1903–1910); died in office in 1910
 Frank G. Mahady, Vermont attorney and judge who served on the Vermont Supreme Court
 William Mason (1808–1883), engine builder; machinist; manufacturer of locomotives and cotton machinery; pioneer in the building of locomotives; patented the "self-acting mule" and "Mason's Self-acting Mule," founder of the Mason Machine Works in 1873; built engine that carried Abraham Lincoln to his grave
 Joseph R. N. Maxwell, Jesuit priest and academic, President of the College of the Holy Cross and Boston College
 Barry McCaffrey (born 1942), military officer, politician, youngest 4-star general in the army at any time, director of the Office of National Drug Control Policy (ONDCP) under President Bill Clinton (1996–2001), drug czar
 Catherine Anna McKenna (1875–?), lawyer; first woman admitted to practice law in California
 Toby Morse (born 1970), musician; lead singer of hardcore punk band H2O
 Marcus Morton (1784–1864), lawyer, jurist, politician, U.S. House member (Massachusetts), Governor of Massachusetts (two terms)
 Joseph P. Murphy, politician; delegate to the Democratic National Convention from Massachusetts, 1936; presumed deceased
 Gordon O'Brien (–2008), career criminal; associate of the Providence-based Patriarca crime family; involved in the failed kidnapping of bookmaker Blaise Marfeo in 1990
 Basil O'Connor (1892–1972), lawyer and aide of Franklin D. Roosevelt; President of the American Red Cross; Chairman of the International Red Cross and Red Crescent Movement
 Marc R. Pacheco, politician; presidential elector for Massachusetts, 1996; delegate to Democratic National Convention from Massachusetts, 2000, 2004
 Edward Padelford (1799–1870), businessman, Confederate officer in the Civil War
 Seth Padelford (1807–1878), politician; lieutenant governor of Rhode Island, 1863–1865; presidential elector for Rhode Island, 1868; governor of Rhode Island, 1869–1873

 Robert Treat Paine (1731–1814), politician; Supreme Court Judge of Massachusetts (1796–1804); signer of the Declaration of Independence
 John F. Parker, Mayor of Taunton, 1953
 Emily Elizabeth Parsons, writer; Civil War nurse; founder of Mt. Auburn Hospital in Massachusetts
 Nicholas Pedro, contestant on Season 6 of American Idol
 Elizabeth Poole (1588–1654), English woman, Puritan, foundress of the present-day city of Taunton, and the first woman to have founded a town in the Americas in 1637
 John "Beans" Reardon (1897–1984), film actor, Major League Baseball umpire, officiated in five World Series games
 Corelli C. W. Simpson (1837–?), American poet, cookbook author, painter
 Sterry Robinson Waterman (1901–1984), lawyer; delegate to Republican National Convention from Vermont, 1936; Judge of U.S. Court of Appeals for the 2nd Circuit, 1955–1970; member of American Bar Association and American Judicature Society
 Louis G. Whitcomb (1903–1984), United States Attorney for Vermont
 Henry Williams (1805–1887), politician; member of Massachusetts state legislature; U.S. Representative from Massachusetts, 1839–1841, 1843–1845 (10th District 1839–1841, 9th District 1843–1845)

References 

 
Taunton, Massachusetts
Taunton